Yasuke ( or ) was a man of African origin who served as a retainer and weapon-bearer to the Japanese daimyō Oda Nobunaga.

In 1579, Yasuke arrived in Japan in the service of the Italian Jesuit missionary Alessandro Valignano, Visitor of Missions in the Indies, in India. Yasuke was one of the several Africans to have come with the Portuguese to Japan during the Nanban trade and is thought by some to have been the first African that Nobunaga had ever seen. He was also present during the Honnō-ji Incident, the forced suicide of Nobunaga at the hands of his general Akechi Mitsuhide on 21 June 1582.

Theories about early life 
This would be consistent with other accounts of Africans from Mozambique in Japan. According to Fujita Midori, the first African people who came to Japan were Mozambican. They reached Japan in 1546 as shipmates or slaves who served Portuguese captain Jorge Álvares (not to be confused with another explorer of the same name who died in 1521).

In 2013, a Japanese TBS television program titled  suggested that Yasuke was a Makua named Yasufe. This name seems to be derived from the more popular Mozambican name Issufo. However, the program provided little evidence for its conclusions. The Makua are not documented as having had any significant contact with the Portuguese based in Mozambique until 1585.

Yasuke may have been a member of the Yao people, or from the more inland area of Mozambique. Yao people were just coming into contact with the Portuguese at the time, which might account for his name: that is,  added to the common Japanese male name suffix of  produces .

Yasuke may have been a slave. Thomas Lockley acknowledges it is possible that Yasuke was enslaved as a child and sent to India, where he could have been employed as a military slave or an indentured soldier, but that he likely obtained his freedom before meeting Valignano. Valignano employed him as bodyguard and valet.

Sudanese claims
Another claim suggests that Yasuke was a Dinka from South Sudan. He was famous for his height and extremely dark skin color.  The Dinka people are among the tallest in Africa, and have significantly darker skin compared to Ethiopians, Eritreans, or Somalis for example.  Adult Dinka men had a ritual custom of drawing decorative patterns on their faces by tattooing, but no account of Yasuke having a face pattern was recorded.

Ethiopian claims
According to another theory, Yasuke was from Ethiopia. Thomas Lockley suggested that this theory is most convincing. Like Yasuke, Ethiopians who were not Jewish (i.e. Beta Israel), Christian, or Muslim were often sold into slavery and called  by the Portuguese; they were well‐built and skilled soldiers.  According to this theory, his original name might be the Amharic name Yisake or the Portuguese name Isaque, derived from Isaac.  Yasufe was also used as a surname in Ethiopia.

Documented life in Japan

Yasuke arrived in Japan in 1579 in service of the Italian Jesuit missionary Alessandro Valignano, who had been appointed the Visitor (inspector) of the Jesuit missions in the Indies (which at that time meant East Africa, South, Southeast, and East Asia). He accompanied Valignano when the latter came to the capital area in March 1581 and his appearance caused much interest with the local people.

When Yasuke was presented to Oda Nobunaga, the Japanese daimyō thought that his skin must have been colored with black ink. Nobunaga had him strip from the waist up and made him scrub his skin. These events are recorded in a 1581 letter of the Jesuit Luís Fróis to Lourenço Mexia, and in the 1582 Annual Report of the Jesuit Mission in Japan, also by Fróis. When Nobunaga realized that the African's skin was indeed black, he took an interest in him.

The  corroborates Fróis's account. It describes the meeting thus: "On the 23rd of the 2nd month [23 March 1581], a  came from the Christian countries. The man was described as robust, black as a bull, and of fine character. Nobunaga's nephew gave him a sum of money at this first meeting." On 14 May, Yasuke departed for Echizen Province with Fróis and the other Christians. During this trip, they met local warlords such as Shibata Katsutoyo, Hashiba Hidekatsu, and Shibata Katsuie. They returned to Kyoto on 30 May.

It is likely that Yasuke could speak or was taught Japanese, perhaps due to Valignano's efforts to ensure his missionaries adapted well to the local culture. Nobunaga enjoyed talking with him (there is no indication that Nobunaga spoke Portuguese, and it is unlikely that Yasuke would have been able to communicate in classical Chinese, the East Asian lingua franca of the time). He was perhaps the only non-Japanese retainer that Nobunaga had in his service, which could explain Nobunaga's interest in him. Yasuke was mentioned in a variant text of the  owned by Sonkeikaku Bunko, the archives of the Maeda clan. According to this, the black man named Yasuke was given his own residence and a short, ceremonial katana by Nobunaga. Nobunaga also assigned him the duty of weapon bearer.

After the Battle of Tenmokuzan, Nobunaga led his force, including Yasuke, and inspected the former territory of the Takeda clan. On his way back, he met Tokugawa Ieyasu. Matsudaira Ietada, the retainer of Ieyasu described Yasuke as "6 shaku 2 sun (6 ft. 2 in., or 188 cm.). He was black, and his skin was like charcoal." Matsudaira stated that he was named Yasuke.

In June 1582, Nobunaga was attacked and forced to commit  in Honnō-ji in Kyoto by the army of Akechi Mitsuhide. Yasuke was there at the time and helped fight the Akechi forces. Immediately after Nobunaga's death, Yasuke went to join Nobunaga's heir Oda Nobutada, who was trying to rally the Oda forces at Nijō Castle. Yasuke fought alongside the Nobutada forces but was eventually captured. However, there is some doubt regarding the credibility of this fate. There is no further written information about him after this.

Possible depictions in art

There is no confirmed portrait of Yasuke drawn by a contemporary.

An ink-stone box made by a Rinpa artist in the 1590s, owned by Museu do Caramulo pt, depicts a black man wearing high-class clothing, who does not appear to be subordinate to the Portuguese. It is possible that this man is Yasuke in Portuguese attire.

, drawn in 1605 by an anonymous artist, depicts a dark-skinned wrestler with a Japanese man in the presence of noble samurai. This samurai is said to be Oda Nobunaga or Toyotomi Hidetsugu. Nobunaga was famous for his fondness for sumo and held many official matches. This  is owned by Sakai City Museum.

In popular culture

 Yasuke is the main protagonist in the 2022 mobile Tactical RPG Yasuke - Black Ronin.

In 1968, author Yoshio Kurusu and artist Genjirō Mita published a children's book about Yasuke titled .
Yasuke inspired the 1971 satirical novel  by Shūsaku Endō.
Since the late 20th century, various Japanese "period drama" television series and manga series have been produced about Yasuke.
Yasuke appears in the 2008 novel  as one of the main characters. This novel was later made into a play in 2017.
Yasuke plays a minor role in the 2005 to 2017 manga series  by Yoshihiro Yamada.
Yasuke is featured in the 2016 to 2020 manga series  by Akechi Kenzaburō and Yutaka Tōdō.
Yasuke appears as Alessandro Valignano's servant in volume 29 of the ongoing manga series  by Takurō Kajikawa.
The ongoing time-travel manga series Nobunaga Concerto by Ayumi Ishii portrays Yasuke as a Black baseball player from the present day.
It has been claimed that the Takashi Okazaki's Afro Samurai franchise is based on Yasuke.
The 2017 video game Nioh and its 2020 sequel feature a fictional portrayal of Yasuke, voiced by Richie Campbell.
In March 2017, Lionsgate announced plans for a live-action film about Yasuke titled Black Samurai. Michael De Luca and Stephen L'Heureux would serve as producers in a co-production between De Luca Productions and Solipsist Films, with Gregory Widen as the screenwriter. In May 2019, Deadline reported that the film, retitled Yasuke, had left Lionsgate for Picturestart, with Doug Miro replacing Widen as the screenwriter. Chadwick Boseman signed on to portray Yasuke in the film and to serve as a co-producer through his production company, Xception Content. In August 2020, Boseman died of colon cancer. As of September 2021, Picturestart's official website states that the film is "in development".
In April 2019, MGM announced plans for their own live-action film about Yasuke, to be produced by Andrew Mittman and Lloyd Braun of Whalerock Industries, with a script written by Stuart C. Paul.
Yasuke is the main protagonist in the 2021 Netflix anime series Yasuke, created by LeSean Thomas and animated by MAPPA. He is voiced by Jun Soejima in Japanese and LaKeith Stanfield in English.
Koei Tecmo's 2021 video game Samurai Warriors 5 includes Yasuke as a playable character, voiced by Paddy Ryan.
A black samurai inspired by Yasuke, named Nagoriyuki, appears in Arc System Works' 2021 fighting game Guilty Gear Strive.
In February 2023, the Brazilian samba school Mocidade Alegre of the São Paulo city carnival performed a samba-song about Yasuke, winning that year's competition.

See also
 Black people in Japan
 List of people who disappeared

References

Citations

Sources

Further reading
 Matsuda, Kiichi, ed., Hōdōsha, 1987–1998.
 Ōta, Gyūichi, 1622.

External links 
 Yasuke: The Real AfroSamurai (documentary)

1580s missing person cases
16th-century African people
Japanese people of African descent
Missing person cases in Japan
Oda retainers